Densign White  (born 21 December 1961) is a male retired British judoka. White competed at the 1984, 1988 and the 1992 Summer Olympics.

Judo career
White won the first of his nine British titles after winning the light-middleweight division at the British Judo Championships in 1980. He stepped up in weight the following year to claim a second title and then completed three in a row when reverting back to -78kg in 1982. After settling at middleweight, he won a fourth title in 1983 before he was selected to represent Great Britain at the 1984 Summer Olympics. He competed in the men's 86 kg division, where he reached the quarter final and repechage final but lost to Walter Carmona in the bronze medal play off. In 1986, he won the silver medal in the 86kg weight category at the judo demonstration sport event as part of the 1986 Commonwealth Games.

A fifth and sixth British title in 1985 and 1987 was followed by a bronze medal at the 1987 World Judo Championships and a silver medal at the 1987 European Judo Championships. In 1988, he won British title number seven and repeated his success at the 1988 European Championships in Pamplona by winning another silver medal. It was also during 1988 that he went to his second Olympic Games, competing in the men's -86kg class and once again just failed to secure a medal after losing in the repechage final.

He won an eighth British title in 1989 and secure a bronze medal at the 1990 European Judo Championships in Frankfurt. He also represented England and won a gold medal in the 86kg middleweight category, at the 1990 Commonwealth Games in Auckland, New Zealand. In 1989 he won his ninth and final British title before represting Great Britain for a third time at the Olympic Games. In Barcelona, he competed in the men's 86kg category, failing to progress from Pool A. It was his last major championships and ended a very successful career.

Personal life
White is married to Tessa Sanderson. He was appointed Member of the Order of the British Empire (MBE) in the 2020 Birthday Honours for services to diversity in sport as chair of Sporting Equals.

References

External links
 

1961 births
Living people
British male judoka
Olympic judoka of Great Britain
Judoka at the 1984 Summer Olympics
Judoka at the 1988 Summer Olympics
Judoka at the 1992 Summer Olympics
Sportspeople from Wolverhampton
Commonwealth Games medallists in judo
Commonwealth Games gold medallists for England
Judoka at the 1990 Commonwealth Games
Members of the Order of the British Empire
Medallists at the 1990 Commonwealth Games